is a Japanese actress, voice actress and narrator who was born in Sendai.

Filmography

Television animation
 Tokimeki Tonight (1982-1983) (Mieru) (ep 10, 24)
 Magical Princess Minky Momo (1982) (Mama)
 The Super Dimension Fortress Macross (1982) (Misa Hayase)
 Aura Battler Dunbine (1983) (Mabel Frozen)
 Genesis Climber Mospeada (1983) (Houquet et Rose)
 Magical Angel Creamy Mami (1983) (Natsume Morisawa)
 Heavy Metal L-Gaim (1984) (Full Flat)
 The Super Dimension Cavalry Southern Cross (1984) (Lana Isavia)
 Moomin (1990) (Too-Ticky)
 Yu Yu Hakusho (1992) (Woman)
 Sailor Moon (1993) (Queen Serenity)
 Fushigi Yuugi (1995) (Subaru)
 Neon Genesis Evangelion (1995) (Naoko Akagi)
 Wedding Peach (1995) (Rain Devila)
 Rurouni Kenshin (1996) (Takani Megumi)
 Boys Over Flowers (1997) (Kaede Domyoji)
 Cowboy Bebop (1998) (Alisa)
 Crest of the Stars (1999) (Empress Ramaj)
 Dual! Parallel Trouble Adventure (1999) (Ayuko Rara)
 Daa! Daa! Daa! (2000) (Rui Yaboshi)
 Saikano (2002) (Shuuji's Mother)
 Air Master (2003) (Kaori Sakiyama)
 Himawari! (2006) (Yatsugashira)
 Ouran High School Host Club (2006) (Kotoko Fujioka)
 A Certain Magical Index III (2018) (Oyafune Monaka)
 Uzumaki (TBA) (Yukie Saito)

Unknown date
 Agatha Christie's Great Detectives Poirot and Marple (Mary Purichādo)
 Canvas 2 ~Niji Iro no Sketch~ (Shizuka Misaki)
 Combat Mecha Xabungle (Gautsu Gamu)
 Futari wa Pretty Cure Splash Star (Saori Hyuga)
 Legend of Heavenly Sphere Shurato (Trailō, the Trailokyavijaya Wisdom Queen)
 Hello! Lady Lynn (Misuzu Midorigawa)
 Hime-chan's Ribbon (Erika's Mother)
 Kiddy Grade (Eclipse)
 Kochikame (Reiko Katherine Akimoto)
 Mushishi (Narrator, Nui)
 One Piece (Koby)
 Yu-Gi-Oh! 5D's (Ancient Fairy Dragon)

Original video animation
 Magical Angel Creamy Mami (1985) (Natsume Morisawa)
 Megazone 23 (1985) (Muller)
 Appleseed (1988) (Fleia)
 Angel Cop (1989) (Yō "Angel" Mikawa)
 Super Mario: Fire Brigade (1989) (Kaoru)
 Ys I: Ancient Books of Ys (1989) (Sarah)
 Devil Hunter Yohko (1990) (Principal)
 Iczer Reborn (1990) (Fiber)
 Mermaid's Forest (1991) (Towa)
 RG Veda (1991) (Kuyou)
 Idol Defense Force Hummingbird (1993) (Hazuki Toreishi)
 Neon Genesis Evangelion: Death & Rebirth (1997) (Naoko Akagi)
 Rurouni Kenshin: Reflection (2001) (Takani Megumi)

Theatrical animation
 Macross: Do You Remember Love? (1984) (Misa Hayase)
 The Super Dimension Fortress Macross (1987) (Misa Hayase)
 Kiki's Delivery Service (1989) (Ket's Mother)

Video games
 Shin Megami Tensei: Persona 2 – Innocent Sin (1999) (Junko Kurosu)
 Kingdom Hearts (2002) (Daisy Duck, Alice)
 Kingdom Hearts II (2005) (Daisy Duck)
 Kingdom Hearts II: Final Mix+ (2007) (Daisy Duck) (archived footage)
 Tales of Graces (2010) (Fodra Queen)
 Kinect Disneyland Adventures (2011) (Daisy Duck, Alice)
 Kingdom Hearts HD 2.5 Remix (2014) (Alice) (Re:Coded Cinematics)

Tokusatsu
 Choujin Sentai Jetman (xxxx) (Fortune-telling Jigen)

Dubbing roles

Live-action
Julia Roberts
 Flatliners (Rachel Manus)
 Sleeping with the Enemy (Laura Williams Burney/Sara Waters)
 Hook (Tinker Bell)
 Stepmom (Isabel Kelly)
 Erin Brockovich (Erin Brockovich)
 The Mexican (Samantha Barzel)
 Confessions of a Dangerous Mind (Patricia Watson)
 Duplicity (Claire Stenwick)
 Mother's Day (Miranda Collins)
 24 (Teri Bauer (Leslie Hope))
 About a Boy (Christine (Sharon Small))
 Above the Law (1993 TV Asahi edition) (Sara Toscani (Sharon Stone))
 Alpha Dog (Olivia Mazursky (Sharon Stone))
 Apollo 13 (1999 NTV edition) (Marilyn Gerlach Lovell (Kathleen Quinlan))
 Bad Boys (Therese Burnett (Theresa Randle))
 Bad Boys for Life (Theresa Burnett (Theresa Randle))
 Beverly Hills Cop II (1990 Fuji TV edition) (Karla Fry (Brigitte Nielsen))
 BH90210 (Gabrielle Carteris/Andrea Zuckerman)
 The Big Lebowski (VHS/DVD edition) (Maude Lebowski (Julianne Moore))
 Born on the Fourth of July (VHS edition) (Donna (Kyra Sedgwick))
 Breaking and Entering (Amira Simić (Juliette Binoche))
 Bride of Chucky (Tiffany Valentine (Jennifer Tilly))
 Broken Trail (Nola Johns (Greta Scacchi))
 The Burning (1985 Fuji TV edition) (Sally (Carrick Glenn))
 The Butler (2016 BS Japan edition) (Nancy Reagan (Jane Fonda))
 Child's Play (Karen Barclay (Catherine Hicks))
 Commando (Cindy (Rae Dawn Chong))
 Consenting Adults (Kay Otis (Rebecca Miller))
 Crash (Dr. Helen Remington (Holly Hunter))
 The Cure (2014 Star Channel edition) (The Girl (Edna Purviance))
 Cyborg (VHS edition) (Pearl Prophet (Dayle Haddon))
 Dance with Me (Ruby Sinclair (Vanessa Williams))
 Days of Thunder (Dr. Claire Lewicki (Nicole Kidman))
 Dead Again (Margaret Strauss / Grace (Emma Thompson))
 Doc Hollywood (Lou (Julie Warner))
 The Fan (Jewel Stern (Ellen Barkin))
 Flash Gordon (1992 TV Asahi edition) (Dale Arden (Melody Anderson))
 Forrest Gump (Mrs. Gump (Sally Field))
 Game of Death (Ann Morris (Colleen Camp))
 Game of Thrones (Catelyn Stark (Michelle Fairley))
 The Glenn Miller Story (2000 TV Tokyo edition) (Helen Burger Miller (June Allyson))
 The Greatest American Hero (Rhonda Blake (Faye Grant))
 Guilty as Sin (Jennifer Haines (Rebecca De Mornay))
 Halloween H20: 20 Years Later (Keri Tate / Laurie Strode (Jamie Lee Curtis))
 The Hard Way (Susan (Annabella Sciorra))
 Harlem Nights (Dominique La Rue (Jasmine Guy))
 Indiana Jones and the Kingdom of the Crystal Skull (Marion Ravenwood (Karen Allen))
 Jacob's Ladder (1993 NTV edition) (Jezebel Pipkin (Elizabeth Peña))
 Jennifer 8 (Helena Robertson (Uma Thurman))
 Kindergarten Cop (Joyce Palmieri / Rachel Myatt Crisp (Penelope Ann Miller))
 Legion (Melanie Bird (Jean Smart))
 Miss Peregrine's Home for Peculiar Children (Dr. Nancy Golan (Allison Janney))
 My Big Fat Greek Life (Aunt Voula (Andrea Martin))
 Nemesis (Julian (Deborah Shelton))
 Night of the Living Dead (1990) (Barbara (Patricia Tallman))
 Night of the Living Dead (1968) (2022 Blu-Ray edition) (Helen Cooper (Marilyn Eastman))
 Nothing but Trouble (Diane Lightson (Demi Moore))
 Pinocchio (Sofia (Lorraine Bracco))
 The Punisher (Sam Leary (Nancy Everhard))
 The Rink (2014 Star Channel edition) (The Girl (Edna Purviance))
 The Running Man (1989 Fuji TV edition) (Amber Méndez (María Conchita Alonso))
 Saw series (Jill Tuck (Betsy Russell))
 Seed of Chucky (Netflix edition), (Tiffany Valentine, Jennifer Tilly)
 Sense and Sensibility (Elinor Dashwood (Emma Thompson))
 Six Feet Under (Ruth Fisher (Frances Conroy))
 Sleepless in Seattle (Annie Reed (Meg Ryan))
 Sommersby (Laurel Sommersby (Jodie Foster))
 Stand by Me (Gordie Lachance (Wil Wheaton))
 Universal Soldier (Veronica Roberts (Ally Walker))
 We Don't Belong Here (Nancy Green (Catherine Keener))
 Working Girl (Tess McGill (Melanie Griffith))

Animation

 Alice in Wonderland (Alice) [1984–2005 dubbing]
 Alvin and the Chipmunks (Jeanette Miller)
 A Bug's Life (Princess Atta)
 Classic short films (Chip), Daisy Duck and Minnie Mouse (Old edition)
 Classic short films (Chip), Daisy Duck (New edition)
 Curious George (Professor Wiseman)
 How the Grinch Stole Christmas (Cindy Lou Who)
 Ice Age: Continental Drift (Granny)
 Ice Age: Collision Course (Granny)
 The Land Before Time (Cera, Ducky) (instead of Rica Matsumoto and Satomi Koorogi)
 Looney Tunes (Tweety Bird, Melissa Duck)
 Peter Pan (1953 film) (Wendy Darling)
 The Little Engine That Could (Missy/Jill)
 Song of the South (Johnny)
 The Many Adventures of Winnie the Pooh (Christopher Robin) [1984 dubbing]
 The Rechid Family (Mrs. Rechid)
 The Sword in the Stone (Arthur)
 Teenage Mutant Ninja Turtles (1987 TV series) (April O'Neil)

References

External links
 Mika Doi at GamePlaza-Haruka Voice Acting Database  (Archived)
 Mika Doi at Hitoshi Doi's Seiyuu Database 
 

1956 births
Living people
Voice actresses from Sendai
Japanese video game actresses
Japanese voice actresses
20th-century Japanese actresses
21st-century Japanese actresses